Kučevo is a town and municipality located in the Braničevo District of the eastern Serbia. In 2011, the population of the town was 3,944, while the population of the municipality was 15,516.

History
In 1973, excavations were conducted in the Kraku Lu Jordan metallurgical complex. The remains of the Roman town dates to the 4th century.

From 1929 to 1941, Kučevo was part of the Morava Banovina of the Kingdom of Yugoslavia.

Demographics

Economy
The following table gives a preview of total number of employed people per their core activity (as of 2017):

References

External links

Populated places in Braničevo District
Municipalities and cities of Southern and Eastern Serbia